The 1983 World Championship Tennis circuit was one of the two rival professional male tennis circuits of 1983. It was organized by World Championship Tennis (WCT). 
The WCT circuit withdrew from the Grand Prix circuit in 1982 and established its own full calendar season consisting of 20 tournaments. For the 1983 season the WCT circuit was downsized to eight tournaments and ran from January to May.

Calendar

See also
 1983 Grand Prix circuit

References

External links
 ATP 1983 results archive

 
World Championship Tennis circuit seasons
World Championship Tennis